University of the Humanities  (also known as Humanities University)  is a public university in Ulaanbaatar, Mongolia, offering undergraduate and graduate programs in fields including foreign languages, translation, education, journalism, computer science, economics business.

The Mongolian name: Хүмүүнлэгийн ухааны их сургууль

The university is accredited by the Mongolian National Council for Education Accreditation 

In 2014 it ranked fifteenth in Mongolia and 18367th in the world on the  Webometrics Ranking of World Universities.  It was ranked 7454th in the world in web rankings according to another source.

Address: Sukhhbaatar Square – 20/4, Baga Toiruu, Sukhbaatar District, P.O. Box – 210646/53.

References

External links
 in English

Universities in Mongolia